Carinavalva is a genus of flowering plants belonging to the family Brassicaceae.

Its native range is Southern Australia.

Species:
 Carinavalva glauca Ising

References

Brassicaceae
Brassicaceae genera